This article describes the works by American vocalist, writer and actor Henry Rollins.

Discography

Musical releases

With State of Alert
1981 No Policy
1982 three songs on the sampler Flex Your Head

With Black Flag
1981 Damaged
1984 My War
1984 Family Man
1984 Slip It In
1984 Live '84
1985 Loose Nut
1985 In My Head
1986 Who's Got the 10½?
1986 Annihilate This Week

As Henry Rollins
1987 Hot Animal Machine
1987 Drive by Shooting
1987 Live - split album with Dutch band Gore

With Rollins Band
1987 Life Time (re-released in 1999)
1989 Hard Volume (re-released in 1999)
1990 Turned On
1992 The End of Silence (double-CD re-released in 2002)
1994 Weight
1997 Come In and Burn
1999 Insert Band Here
2000 A Clockwork Orange Stage
2000 Get Some Go Again
2001 Nice
2002 A Nicer Shade of Red
2002 End of Silence Demos
2002 The Only Way to Know for Sure: Live in Chicago
2002 Rise Above: 24 Black Flag Songs to Benefit the West Memphis Three

With Wartime
1990 Fast Food for Thought

Spoken word
1985  Short Walk on a Long Pier
1987  Big Ugly Mouth
1989  Sweatbox
1990  Live at McCabe's
1992  Human Butt
1993  The Boxed Life
1998  Think Tank
1999  Eric the Pilot
2001  A Rollins in the Wry
2001  Live at the Westbeth Theater
2003  Talk Is Cheap: Volume 1
2003  Talk Is Cheap: Volume 2
2004  Talk Is Cheap: Volume 3
2004  Talk Is Cheap: Volume 4
2008  Provoked
2010  Spoken Word Guy
2010  Spoken Word Guy 2

Spoken word videos
1993 Talking from the Box
1995 Henry Rollins Goes to London
1998 You Saw Me Up There
1999 Henry Rollins Live & Ripped in London
2001 Up for It
2004 Live at Luna Park
2004 Shock & Awe: The Tour
2005 Live in the Conversation Pit
2006 Uncut from NYC
2006 Uncut from Israel
2007 San Francisco 1990
2008 Provoked: Live from Melbourne
2009 Uncut From Northern Ireland, South Africa & New Orleans
2012 50
2018 Keep Talking, Pal.

Audio books
1994  Get in the Van: On the Road with Black Flag
1996  Everything
1997  Black Coffee Blues
2004  Nights Behind the Tree Line
2007   World War Z   T. Sean Collins

Guest appearances and collaborations

Bibliography
20, 1984, SST Pubs. Art by Raymond Pettibon. 2nd edition included copyright info, booking info, was hand numbered, and included the words "Second Edition," also hand written.
Two Thirteen Sixty-One, Volume I, March 1985, 2.13.61 Publications/Illiterati Press
End to End: Two Thirteen Sixty-One, Volume II, 1985, 2.13.61 Publications/Illiterati Press
Polio Flesh: Two Thirteen Sixty-One, Volume III, 1985, 2.13.61 Publications/Illiterati Press
You Can't Run From God, 1986, 2.13.61 Publications/Illiterati Press. Limited to 1,000 copies. Never re-printed. No ISBN available.
Hallucinations of Grandeur, 1986, 2.13.61 Publications/Illiterati Press, 
Pissing In the Gene Pool, 1987, 2.13.61 Publications, 
Works, 1988, 2.13.61 Publications
Art to Choke Hearts, 1989, 2.13.61 Publications
1000 Ways to Die, 1989, 2.13.61 Publications
Knife Street, 1989, 2.13.61 Publications
Body Bag, 1989, Creation Press, . UK Exclusive Compilation of Two Thirteen Sixty-One, End To End, and Polio Flesh.
The Jackass Theory, 1989 Creation Press, . UK Exclusive Compilation of 1000 Ways to Die and Knife Street.
High Adventure In the Great Outdoors, 1990, 2.13.61 Publications, . US Exclusive Compilation of Two Thirteen Sixty-One, End To End and Polio Flesh.
Bang!, 1990, 2.13.61 Publications, . US Exclusive Compilation of 1000 Ways to Die and Knife Street.
Art to Choke Hearts & Pissing in the Gene Pool: Collected Writing 1985-1987, 1992, 2.13.61 Publications, 
Black Coffee Blues, 1992, 2.13.61 Publications, 
See A Grown Man Cry, 1992, 2.13.61 Publications, 
Now Watch Him Die, 1993, 2.13.61 Publications, 
One From None, 1993, 2.13.61 Publications, 
Get In the Van: On the Road With Black Flag, 1994, 2.13.61 Publications, 
Eye Scream, October 1996, 2.13.61 Publications, 
See a Grown Man Cry, Now Watch Him Die, August 1997, 2.13.61 Publications, 
The First Five: Collected Work of Henry Rollins from 1983-1987, October 1997, 2.13.61 Publications, . Compilation of High Adventure in the Great Outdoors, Pissing in the Gene Pool, Bang!, 
Art To Choke Hearts and One From None
Solipsist, August 1998, 2.13.61 Publications, 
The Portable Henry Rollins, February 10, 1998, Villard, . Contains material from: High Adventure in the Great Outdoors, Art to Choke Hearts, Bang!, Black Coffee Blues, Get In the Van: On the Road with Black Flag, Do I Come Here Often?, Solipsist & previously unpublished material
Do I Come Here Often? (Black Coffee Blues, Pt. 2),  December 1998, 2.13.61 Publications,  Illustrated by Shannon Wheeler
Smile, You're Traveling (Black Coffee Blues Part 3), October 2000, 2.13.61 Publications, 
Unwelcomed Songs, September 2002, 2.13.61 Publications, 
Broken Summers, November 2003, 2.13.61 Publications, 
Fanatic! Song Lists and Notes From the Harmony In My Head Radio Show, 2005, 2.13.61 Publications, 
Roomanitarian, November 2005, 2.13.61 Publications, 
A Dull Roar: What I Did on My Summer Deracination 2006 , November 2006, 2.13.61 Publications, 
Fanatic! 2: Song Lists and Notes From the Harmony In My Head Radio Show 2006, November 2007,  2.13.61 Publications
Fanatic! 3: Song Lists and Notes From the Harmony In My Head Radio Show 2007, 2008, 2.13.61 Publications
A Preferred Blur: Reflections, Inspections, and Travel in All Directions 2007, 2009, 2.13.61 Publications, 
A Mad Dash: Introspective Exhortations and Geographical Considerations 2008, 2009, 2.13.61 Publications
Occupants: Photographs and Writings by Henry Rollins, 2011, Chicago Review Press, 
Before the Chop: LA Weekly Articles 2011-2012, 2013, 2.13.61 Publications 
A Grim Detail: Destination Documentation and Multi-Continental Self Examination 2009-2010, 2014, 2.13.61 Publications
Before the Chop II: LA Weekly Articles 2013-2014, 2015, 2.13.61 Publications 
Before the Chop III: LA Weekly Articles 2014-2016, 2017, 2.13.61 Publications
Before the Chop IV: LA Weekly Articles (And More) 2012-2018, 2018, 2.13.61 Publications
Stay Fanatic!!! Vol. 1: Hectic Expectorations For the Music Obsessive, 2019, 2.13.61 Publications
Stay Fanatic!!! Vol. 2: Jovial Bloviations For the Vinyl Inspired, 2020, 2.13.61 Publications
Stay Fanatic!!! Vol. 3: Frantic Rants For the Turntable Able, 2022, 2.13.61 Publications
Sic, December 2022, 2.13.61 Publications
Stay Fanatic!!! Vol. 4, TBA, 2.13.61 Publications

Filmography
 Masters of the Universe: Revelation (2021) TV Series - Tri-Klops (voice)
Deadly Class (2018) TV Series - Jurgen Denke 
Keep Talking, Pal (2018) - Showtime comedy special
The Last Heist (2016) - Bernard
Gutterdammerung (2016) - Priest Svengali
He Never Died (2015) - Jack
The Legend of Korra (2014)  TV Series - Zaheer (voice)
In the House of Flies (2012) - The Voice
Sons of Anarchy (2010) TV Series - A.J. Weston
Suck (2009) - Rockin' Roger
The Devil's Tomb (2009) - Fulton
Henry Rollins: Uncut From South Africa (2008) Documentary - Himself
Henry Rollins: Uncut From Northern Ireland (2008) Documentary - Himself
Henry Rollins: Uncut From New Orleans (2008) Documentary - Himself
Henry Rollins: Uncut From Israel (2007) Documentary - Himself
Wrong Turn 2 (2007) - Dale Murphy
The Henry Rollins Show (2006–2007) - Host
Tom Green Live! (2006) - Guest
American Hardcore (2006) - Himself
The Alibi (2006) - Putty
Feast (2005) - Coach
We Jam Econo (2005) - Himself
The Alibi (2005) - Putty
Punk: Attitude (2004) Documentary - Himself
The Drew Carey Show (2004) TV Series - Thug from eBay
Henry's Film Corner (2004) TV Series - Host
Teen Titans (2004) (voice) — Johnny Rancid
Deathdealer: A Documentary (2004) - Vincent
Def Jam: Fight for NY (2004)(VG) - Himself
Live Freaky Die Freaky (2003)(voice)
Mace Griffin: Bounty Hunter (2003)(VG)(voice) - Mace Griffin
A House on a Hill (2003) - Arthur
Bad Boys II (2003) - TNT Leader
Full Metal Challenge (2002–2003) TV Series - Host
Psychic Murders (2002) (V) - Johnny Miracle
Jackass: The Movie (2002) - Himself (cameo) (Offroad Tattoo)
Shadow Realm (2002)(TV)
The New Guy (2002) - Warden
Morgan's Ferry (2001) - Monroe
Dogtown and Z-Boys (2001) Documentary - Himself
Time Lapse (2001) (V) - Gaines
Scenes of the Crime (2001) - Greg
Night Visions (2001) TV Series (uncredited) - Host
The Human Journey (2000) TV special - Narrator
Henry Rollins: Live and Ripped From London (2000)
Batman Beyond: Return of the Joker (2000) (V) (voice) - Benjamin 'Ben' Knox/Bonk
Desperate But Not Serious (2000) - Bartender
Batman Beyond (1999) TV Series - Mad Stan
Jack Frost (1998) - Sid Gronic
The Doors Legends TV special (1997) Narrator
Lost Highway (1997) - Guard Henry
Walker: Texas Ranger (1996) TV Series - Credited as the man with no neck
Heat (1995) - Hugh Benny
Dennis Miller Live - Guest  (1995)
Johnny Mnemonic (1995) - Spider
The Chase (1994) - Officer Dobbs
Pop Goes The Weasel - music video from hip-hop group 3rd Bass, cameo as Vanilla Ice (1991)
Kiss Napoleon Goodbye (1990) - Jackson
The Right Side of My Brain (1984)

References

Rock music discographies
Discographies of American artists